The Tamil University is a public state university located in Thanjavur, Tamil Nadu, India. It was established to provide higher research in the Tamil language.

Location

Buildings and blocks for the administrative and academic departments are located in the campus. The administrative block with its  gopuram motif can be seen from the National Highway connecting Thanjavur with Trichy. The library is reminiscent of the Indian Parliament at New Delhi. The Karikalan Gallery, built on the occasion of the World Tamil Conference is capable of accommodating about 2000 people.

Vice Chancellors

See also
World Tamil Conference

References

External links

Official website
Official website for Online Education

Academic language institutions
Tamil-language education
Language education in India
Universities in Tamil Nadu
Education in Thanjavur
Educational institutions established in 1981
1981 establishments in Tamil Nadu
Thanjavur district